The Bhatti Khanzada of Awadh are a Muslim Rajput community found mainly in the Barabanki district of Uttar Pradesh in India. There is also a distinct community of Bhattis found in the village of Yahiapur in Pratapgarh district. The Awadh region covers most of the eastern areas of Uttar Pradesh, and is home to a distinct culture. A small number of Bhatti Muslims are also found in the districts of Bahraich and Balrampur. They are sub-group within the larger Khanzada community of eastern Uttar Pradesh.

Other than the taluqdar families, the majority of the Barabanki Bhatti are small to medium-sized farmers. With the abolishment of zamindari system of feudal ownership, has had a strong impact on the large landowning families, as much of their land has been redistributed. They are Shia  Muslims, The Bhatti have always been more orthodox then the Khanzada, a neighbouring Muslim Rajput community. Like other communities in Awadh, they are largely endogamous, marrying close kin. They have no connection with the Ranghar Bhatti of western Uttar Pradesh or those of Punjab.

There are also other Bhatti communities in Awadh, such as those of Yahiapur in Pratapgarh district. They have no connection with the Barabanki Bhattis.

See also
 Bhatti
 Qidwai

References

Rajput clans
Social groups of Uttar Pradesh
Muslim communities of Uttar Pradesh
Muslim communities of India
Khanzada Bhatti Caste  is a Baloch Tribe in Tibbi Lundan